Africa Magic is a collection of Pay TV entertainment channels that focus on African programming, most popularly Nigerian series and movies. Africa Magic, which started off as single channel of the same name, is a brand owned by M-Net and now comprises seven channels.

History
Africa Magic was launched in July 2003 as a movie and general entertainment channel geared at showcasing Nollywood talent and African culture and couture. At the time of its launch it received high popularity amongst DStv subscribers, especially in South Africa and Nigeria. Thus the launching of a sister channel, Africa Magic Plus, was made possible. The two channels went on another brand identity
and over the next decade, the brand expanded to include seven more channels comprising movies, television shows and general entertainment. Africa Magic broadcasts in more than 50 African countries. The channels include Africa Magic Family, Africa Magic Showcase, Africa Magic Yoruba,  Africa Magic Igbo, Africa Magic Hausa. Africa Magic Epic and Africa Magic Urban. Africa Magic is also responsible for the annual Africa Magic Viewers' Choice Awards (AMVCAs), the biggest celebration of film and television talent in Africa.

Africa Magic's original programmes

Stations
Africa Magic started out as a single Nollywood channel which gained popularity from Multichoice's biggest revenue generators, South Africa and Nigeria, the reason why Africa Magic plus was launched. These were later renamed along with the creation of new channels.
In 2017, Its rerun channel, Africa Magic World was discontinued due to lack of viewership.

Africa Magic Showcase

Previously Africa Magic Plus then Africa Magic Entertainment. The premium tier channel showing first-run original series, reality shows and latest nollywood movie premiers.

Africa Magic Urban

Previously Africa Magic Movies 1. A contemporary lifestyle entertainment channel with predominantly movies and talk shows, as well as series from Mzansi Magic

Africa Magic Epic

Previously Africa Magic Movies. A channel inspired by Africa's traditional roots with movies and series depicting cultural aspects.

Africa Magic Family

The parent Africa Magic channel serving family-oriented programs.

Regional channels

 Africa Magic Hausa – Movies and series broadcast in Hausa
 Africa Magic Yoruba –Movies and series broadcast in Yoruba
 Africa Magic Igbo – Movies and series broadcast in Igbo

Affiliates
These are channels affiliated to the Africa Magic and share most of the programs, which are independently sourced from their respective regions. Content from these channels are either displayed in their original soundtrack or dubbed in English.

 Maisha Magic – Formerly Africa Magic Swahili. A channel catering for the East African diaspora. Has five dedicated entertainment channels, Maisha Magic East, Maisha Magic Plus, Maisha Magic Bongo, Maisha Magic Movies and Maisha Magic POA. 
 Jango Magic – The West African-inspired channel serving Angola and Mozambique with a Kenyan version of The Voice
 Zambezi Magic – Channel catering for Southern African nations such as Zimbabwe and Botswana. It primarily carries original drama series and content from Mzansi Magic.
 Pearl Magic – Channel serving the Ugandan diaspora
 Mzansi Magic – Channel that broadcasts South African series. Many of their programs are shown on Africa Magic Showcase and Africa Magic Urban. Has sister channels Mzansi Wethu, Mzansi Bioskop and Mzansi Music
Akwaaba Magic - channel serving Ghanaian audiences
Abol TV - channel created for Amharic speaking audiences

Defunct services
 Africa Magic World – Channel derived from MagicWorld. Played mostly reruns.
 Africa Magic Go – Subscription-based Video-on-demand service available to users outside Africa

Africa Magic Viewers' Choice Awards 
The Africa Magic Viewers' Choice Awards (AMVCA) is an annual accolade presented by Multichoice recognizing outstanding achievement in television and film. The inaugural Africa Magic Viewers’ Choice Awards ceremony was held in Lagos, Lagos State in Nigeria on 9 March 2013, and was broadcast live in more than 50 countries. Entries into the award ceremony are films and TV series that have been aired in the previous year.

In other uses
 Veteran OAP, Olisa Adibua refers to Omotola Jalade Ekeinde as "the real Africa Magic" during the annual AMVCA ceremony.

References

Television stations in South Africa
Television stations in Nigeria
2003 establishments in South Africa
Television channels and stations established in 2003